The Somali Latin alphabet is an official writing script in the Federal Republic of Somalia and its constituent Federal Member States. It was developed by a number of leading scholars of Somali, including Musa Haji Ismail Galal, B. W. Andrzejewski and Shire Jama Ahmed specifically for transcribing the Somali language, and is based on the Latin script. The Somali Latin alphabet uses all letters of the English Latin alphabet with the exception of p, v and z. There are no diacritics or other special characters, although it includes three consonant digraphs: DH, KH and SH. Tone is not marked and a word-initial glottal stop is also not shown.  Capital letters are used for names and at the beginning of a sentence.

Form
The Somali Latin alphabet is largely phonemic, with consonants having a one-to-one correspondence between graphemes and phonemes. Long vowels are written by doubling the vowel. However, the distinction between tense and lax vowels is not represented. Diphthongs are represented using Y or W as the second element (AY, AW, EY, OY and OW) and long diphthongs are shown with the first vowel doubled.

As there is no central regulation of the language, there is some variation in orthography, the endings -ay and -ey being particularly interchangeable.

The Somali Latin alphabet, which follows an Arabic-based order, is seen in the following table. The letters' names (with their Arabic equivalents) are spelt out in the following table.

The Somali alphabet lacks equivalents of the Arabic letters thāʼ, dhal, zāy, ṣād, ḍād, and ṭāʼ.

The following elements of the Somali alphabet either are not IPA symbols in their lower case versions, or else have values divergent from IPA symbols:
J –
X – 
KH – 
SH – 
DH – 
C – 
W –  or the second element in a diphthong
Y –  or the second element in a diphthong
A –  or 
E –  or 
I –  or 
O –  or 
U –  or

See also
Somali alphabets
Regional Somali Language Academy

Notes

References

External links
 Osmanya, Borama, Wadaad's writing and the Somali language

Latin alphabets
Writing systems of Africa
Somali language
Somali orthography